The Prudent is an epithet applied to:

Louis XI (1423-1483), King of France
Philip II of Spain (1527-1598), King of Spain
Sancho VII of Navarre (1154-1234), King of Navarre

Lists of people by epithet